Douglas T. Pickett is an American politician and rancher serving as a member of the Idaho House of Representatives for the 27A district. He assumed office on December 1, 2022.

Early life and education 
Born in Twin Falls, Idaho, Pickett graduated from Oakley Junior/Senior High School. He earned a Bachelor of Science degree in economics from Brigham Young University in 1995. A member of The Church of Jesus Christ of Latter-day Saints, Pickett served a mission in Germany.

Career 
With his brothers, Pickett co-owns and operates Pickett Ranch, which produces wheat, potatoes, beef, and lamb. He served as a commissioner of the Oakley Valley Cemetery District, vice chair of the Cassia County Gateway Powerline Task Force, and chair of the Cassia County Federal Lands Advisory Group. Pickett was elected to the Idaho House of Representatives in November 2022, succeeding Scott Bedke.

References 

Living people
People from Twin Falls, Idaho
Brigham Young University alumni
People from Cassia County, Idaho
Republican Party members of the Idaho House of Representatives
The Church of Jesus Christ of Latter-day Saints members
Year of birth missing (living people)